Jake Bailey may refer to:
 Jake Bailey (make-up artist) (1978–2015), American make-up artist and photographer
 Jake Bailey (American football) (born 1997), American football punter

See also
 Jacob Bailey (disambiguation)